Lisa Jackson may refer to:
Lisa F. Jackson (born 1950) American documentary filmmaker
Lisa P. Jackson (born 1962), former administrator of the U.S. Environmental Protection Agency
Lisa Jackson (author) (born 1952), American author of romance novels and thrillers
Lisa Jackson (actress) (born 1979), British actress
Lisa Jackson (filmmaker) Canadian and Anishinaabe documentary filmmaker